Mount Tecumseh is a  mountain summit located in the Canadian Rockies of Alberta, Canada.

Description

The mountain anchors the southern end of the High Rock Range and precipitation runoff from the mountain drains into tributaries of the nearby Crowsnest River. The nearest higher neighbor is Crowsnest Mountain,  to the northeast.

History

Mount Tecumseh was named to honor Tecumseh (1768–1813), a Shawnee chief and warrior who became an iconic folk hero in American, Indigenous, and Canadian popular history.  The meaning of "Tecumseh" translates as "Shooting Star." The mountain's toponym was officially adopted in 1957 by the Geographical Names Board of Canada. Phillipps Peak is named after Michael Phillipps who in 1873 was the first white man to cross Crowsnest Pass.

Geology
Mount Tecumseh is composed of sedimentary rock laid down during the Precambrian to Jurassic periods.

Climate
Based on the Köppen climate classification, Mount Tecumseh has an alpine subarctic climate with cold, snowy winters, and mild summers. Temperatures can drop below −20 °C with wind chill factors below −30 °C.

Gallery

See also
Geology of Alberta
List of memorials to Tecumseh

References

External links
 Mount Tecumseh weather forecast
 Mount Tecumseh (photo): Flickr

Two-thousanders of Alberta
Canadian Rockies
Crowsnest Pass, Alberta